Starlets Academy is a school located in Old GRA, Port Harcourt in Rivers State, Nigeria. It has both a secondary and primary school in the same campus. It was founded by Kudo Eresia Eke.

References

Schools in Port Harcourt
Secondary schools in Rivers State
Old GRA, Port Harcourt
Primary schools in Rivers State